West Cross railway station served the suburb of West Cross, in the historical county of Glamorgan, Wales, from 1807 to 1960 on the Swansea and Mumbles Railway.

History
The station was opened on 25 March 1807 by the Oystermouth Railway. Like the rest of the stations on the line, the first services were horse-drawn. It closed in 1827 but it reopened on 11 November 1860. It was first known as West Cross Road in Bradshaw. It was resited on the line deviation on 26 August 1900 and resited again, closer to Norton Road, on 5 March 1910. It was briefly renamed West Cross New in Bradshaw. It was also known as West Cross Road in the handbook of stations until 1938. The station closed along with the line on 6 January 1960.

References

Disused railway stations in Swansea
Railway stations in Great Britain opened in 1860
Railway stations in Great Britain closed in 1960
1960 disestablishments in Wales